Green Cosmos is a 2005 EP release by American experimental rock band Deerhoof.

Track listing
"Come See the Duck" – 1:06
"Green Cosmos" – 3:24
"Malalauma" – 2:26
"Spiral Golden Town" – 2:59
"Hot Mint Air Balloon" – 1:05
"Koneko Kitten" – 2:10
"Byun" – 2:14

References

Deerhoof albums
2005 EPs
ATP Recordings albums